The Rhos-Rydd Shield, or Rhyd y Gors (or less commonly Glan-rhos shield) is a large copper-alloy Yetholm-type shield from the Bronze Age, found in Rhos-Rydd or Rhyd y Gors, near Blaenplwyf, Wales. It is currently held in the British Museum in London.  It is completely flat, 667 mm across, and 0.7 mm thick, weighing 1929 grams.  It dates from the 12th to the 10th century BC.

History 

This perfectly preserved Bronze Age facing from an ancient British shield was found in the marsh at Rhyd-y-gors, Ceredigion, before 1834 according to some sources.

According to another source, the shield was found in 1804 in Rhos Rydd bog.

The shield was donated to the British Museum by Sir Augustus Wollaston Franks in 1873. This shield is an example of early Bronze Age copper alloy use.

There have been calls for the artefact to return to Wales.

See also 

 Archaeology of Wales

References 

Archaeology of Wales
Bronze Age Wales
Individual shields
Prehistoric objects in the British Museum
Welsh artefacts